Sakamoto is the 40th most common Japanese surname. Notable people with the surname include:

Chika Sakamoto (born 1959), voice actor and singer
Fuyumi Sakamoto (born 1967), enka singer
, Japanese professional baseball player
Hideki Sakamoto (born 1972), video game composer
, Japanese swimmer
Kaori Sakamoto (born 2000), Japanese figure skater
Kazma Sakamoto (born 1982), Japanese professional wrestler
, Japanese swimmer
Kerri Sakamoto (born 1960), Canadian novelist
, Japanese footballer
), gymnast
Kyu Sakamoto (1941–1985), pop singer well known for his song Sukiyaki in the 1960s
Maaya Sakamoto (born 1980), voice actor and singer
Miu Sakamoto (born 1980), pop singer, daughter of Ryuichi Sakamoto
Ryuichi Sakamoto (born 1952), musician and composer, as well as an actor
Sakamoto Ryōma (1836–1867), military leader prior to the Meiji Restoration
, Japanese baseball player
, Japanese water polo player
Shōgo Sakamoto (born 1993), young actor and singer
, Japanese footballer
Soichi Sakamoto (1921–2012), American swimming coach
, Japanese high jumper
, Japanese freestyle skier
, Japanese footballer
, Japanese sprint canoeist
Yoshio Sakamoto (born 1959), game designer for Nintendo
The victims of the Sakamoto family murder perpetrated by members of the Aum Shinrikyo cult

Fictional characters
Sakamoto (Maison Ikkoku), from Maison Ikkoku
Sakamoto-san, a talking cat from Nichijou
Sakamoto from Haven't You Heard? I'm Sakamoto
Akira Sakamoto, and Harumi Sakamoto from Princess Princess
Chiyo Sakamoto from Memoirs of a Geisha
Julietta Sakamoto from Air Master
 Ryōta Sakamoto (坂本 竜太), the main character in the manga series Btooom! (ブトゥーム!) 
Sue, her brother Kazuma, and their mother Momorin Sakamoto from Cave Story
Mio Sakamoto, from Strike Witches
, the main character in the 2002 South Korean science fiction film 2009: Lost Memories
Ryuji Sakamoto, from Persona 5
Taro Sakamoto, from Sakamoto Days
Tatsuma Sakamoto, from Gintama

References

Japanese-language surnames